= 4/1 =

4/1 may refer to:

- April 1 (month-day date notation)
- January 4 (day-month date notation)
- 4 divided by 1 (4)
